Ulas Oleksiiovych Samchuk (20 February 1905, Derman – 9 July 1987 Toronto) was a Ukrainian writer, propagandist, publicist, journalist, and a member of the Government of the Ukrainian People's Republic in exile. He was a member of the nationalistic Organization of Ukrainian Nationalists, a Nazi collaborator, and noted antisemite.

Biography 
From 1917 to 1920 he studied at a four-grade elementary school in Derman. In 1921–1925 he studied at the Kremenets Ukrainian private gymnasium. Before he finished his secondary education, he was called up for service in the Polish Army in 1927, and later deserted in August of that year, escaping to Germany. In Germany he worked delivering coal, and with the help of a supportive German family, Samchuk continued his studies at the University of Breslau.

In 1929, Samchuk moved to Prague, Czechoslovakia. He was attracted by the city's vibrant Ukrainian community and the Ukrainian Free University in which he enrolled, and where he graduated in 1931.

In 1932, while in Prague, Samchuk first heard about the Holodomor famine, and travelled back into Soviet Ukraine to witness the event firsthand. In response, Samchuk wrote the novel Maria (1934)––the first literary work about the famine, and village life at the time. In 1937, on the initiative of Yevhen Konovalets, a cultural office of the Ukrainian nationalist leadership headed by Oleh Olzhych was established. Prague became the centre of the Cultural Office, and one of the main institutions was the Section of artists, writers and journalists, chaired by Samchuk.

While Samchuks pre-war  works did not appear antisemitic, to the contrary, they had described a childhood with close Jewish friends. During the war period his writings would go in the opposite direction, and would praise Hitler and call for support of the German army, while urging support to fight the "jewish-bolshevik" regime of the USSR.

In 1941 he returned to Volyn as a member of one of the ultranationalist Organization of Ukrainian Nationalists marching groups, where during 1941–1942, worked for the Nazi's, within the Reichskommissariat Ukraine, as chief editor of the pro-Nazi newspaper Volyn. During this time, he notably wrote of the babin yar massacre “Today is a great day for Kyiv”

on September 1, 1941, shortly before the Babi Yar massacres Samchuk wrote on page 2 of Volyn: “The element that settled our cities, whether it is Jews or Poles who were brought here from outside Ukraine, must disappear completely from our cities. The Jewish problem is already in the process of being solved.” 

Later that month, in the article "Zavoiovuimo misto" (Let's conquer the City)  Samchuk added the following: “All elements that reside in our land, whether they are Jews or Poles, must be eradicated. We are at this very moment resolving the Jewish question, and this resolution is part of the plan for the Reich’s total reorganization of Europe.” "The empty space that will be created, must immediately and irrevocable be filled by the real owners and masters of this land, the Ukrainian people"

The Jewish Bolshevism theme would run throughout his articles during the war period. As an example On November 30, 1941 he wrote on witnessing the aftermath of destruction in Ternopil, caused during fighting between soviet partisan and Nazi forces, "All this occurred because of the will of the sons of Israel, who could find no better way of saving their native Soviet Union then by setting fire to the town as soon as the German army entered"

He remained the chief editor of the Volyn newspaper until March 1942. In February 1942, after Nazi authorities implemented a stricter media censorship on the subject on Ukrainian independence. In Issue 23 of Volyn on March 22, 1942 Samchuk penned an emotional editorial article "Tak bulo - Tak bude" (This is how it was - That is how it will be) that espoused Ukrainian independence, resulting in him arrested and imprisonment by the Gestapo. He was release about one month later, and then began working for the Allgemeiner Deutscher Nachrichtendienst.

With soviet forces approaching Galacia, and Samchuk fearing repercussions for being a Nazi collaborator he then fled to Nazi Germany in 1944, where he founded and headed the literary-artistic organization MUR. 

In 1948, he emigrated to Canada and became the leader of the Slovo Association of Ukrainian Writers in Exile.

He died in Toronto on 9 July 1987.  and is buried at the St. Volodymyr Ukrainian Cemetery in Oakville, Ontario.

Work 

He published his first short story, "On Old Paths", in 1926 in the Warsaw magazine Nasha Besida. In Samchuk'sVolyn trilogy (I–III, 1932–1937), a collective image of a Ukrainian young man of the late 1920s and early 1930s is derived, which seeks to find Ukraine's place in the world.

From 1929 he began to collaborate regularly with the Literary-Scientific Bulletin, The Bells (magazines published in Lviv), The Independent Thought (Chernivtsi), the Nation-Building (Berlin), and the Antimony (without a permanent location).

Samchuk concurrently wrote the novel Kulak(1932) about the eternal commitment of the Ukrainian peasant to tilling the land and the undying optimism of farmers. His next important work was the two-volume novel The Mountains Speak (1934) which explored Carpatho-Ukraine's struggle against Hungary.

In 1947 he completed the drama Noise of the Mill. The unfinished trilogy Ost: Frost Farm (1948) and Darkness (1957), which depicts the Ukrainian man and his role in the unusual and tragic conditions of interwar and modern sub-Soviet reality.

The topics of Samchuk's final books are about the struggle of the Ukrainian Insurgent Army in Volhynia (the novel What Doesn't Heal Fire, 1959) and the life of Ukrainian emigrants in Canada (On Hard Land, 1967). Memoirs of Five to Twelve (1954) and On a White Horse (1956) are devoted to the experience of World War II.

Works 
 Volyn (1932–1937, 1941-1942)
 Kulak (1932)
 Mountains Are Talking [Hory hovoriat] (1934)
 Maria (1934), (English translation, Maria. A Chronicle of a Life 1952)
 Youth of Vasyl Sheremeta (1946–1947)
 Moroz's Khutir [Moroziv khutir] (1948)
 Darkness [Temnota] (1957)
 Escape from oneself [Vtecha vid sebe]
 People or Servants? [Liudy chy chern]
 Five Past Twelve [Pyat po dvanadtsiatiy] (1954)
 On a White Horse [Na bilomu koni] (1956)
 On a Black Horse [Na koni voronomu] 
 What Fire does not Heal [Choho ne hoit ohon] (1959)
 Where does the river flow? [Kudy teche richka?]
 On Solid Earth [Na tverdiy zemli] (1967)
 In the Footsteps of Pioneers: The Saga of Ukrainian America (1979)

Bibliography
 Ułas Samczuk, Wołyń, wyd. 2 (reprint),  Biały Dunajec — Ostróg 2005, wyd. «Wołanie z Wołynia»
 Самчук У. Гори говорять. — К., 1996.
 Самчук У. Волинь: У 2 т. — К.: Дніпро, 1993. — Т.1, 2.
 Самчук У. Дермань. Роман: У 2 ч. — Рівне: Волинські обереги, 2005. — 120 с.
 Самчук У. На білому коні. — Львів: Літопис Червоної Калини, 1999.
 Самчук У. На коні вороному. — Львів: Літопис Червоної Калини, 2000.
 Самчук У. Темнота. Роман. — Нью-Йорк, 1957. — 493 с.
 Самчук У. Чого не гоїть огонь. — К.: Укр. письменник, 1994.
 Самчук У. Юність Василя Шеремети: Роман. — Рівне: Волин. обереги, 2005. — 329 с.
 Волинські дороги Уласа Сачука: Збірник. — Рівне: Азалія, 1993.
 Гром'як Р. Розпросторення духовного світу Уласа Самчука (Від трилогії «Волинь» до трилогії «Ost») // Орієнтації. Розмисли. Дискурси. 1997—2007. — Тернопіль: Джура, 2007. — С. 248—267.
 Улас Самчук. Ювілейний збірник. До 90-річчя народження. — Рівне: Азалія, 1994. 274
 Тарнавський О. Улас Самчук — прозаїк // Відоме й позавідоме. — К.: Час, 1999. — С. 336—350.
 Ткачук М. П. Художні виміри творчості Уласа Самчука // Українська мова і література в школі. — 2005. — № 6: — С. 43–47.

References

External links 
 Author Biography: Ulas Samchuk

1905 births
1987 deaths
20th-century Canadian male writers
20th-century Canadian journalists
20th-century Ukrainian journalists
Nazi propagandists
Organization of Ukrainian Nationalists
People from Rivne Oblast
Ukrainian expatriates in the Czech Republic
Ukrainian male writers
Ukrainian SSR emigrants to Canada